Winton railway station served the village of New Winton, East Lothian, Scotland, from 1872 to 1925 on the Macmerry Branch.

History 
The station was opened on 1 May 1872 by the North British Railway. On the west platform was the station building, on the east side was the goods yard and on the north side was the signal box. The station closed on 1 July 1925.

References 

Disused railway stations in East Lothian
Former North British Railway stations
Railway stations in Great Britain opened in 1872
Railway stations in Great Britain closed in 1925
1872 establishments in Scotland
1925 disestablishments in Scotland